FreedomFi is a company for cellular networking.

Gateway 
The FreedomFi Gateway is a x86 device which as functions as a Wireless LAN  (stylized as LoRaLAN: Long Range Local Area Network) node in a 4G network for the Internet of Things (IoT).

Helium 

FreedomFi has partnered with the Helium blockchain (ticker symbol "HFT") to expand its coverage; HFT is awarded as an incentive.

References

External links 

 https://freedomfi.com
 https://www.helium.com

Telecommunications